Beverley Cooper is a Canadian actor, director, dramaturg, and playwright who works in film, radio, television, and theatre.

Acting
Cooper trained in acting and graduated from Studio 58 in Vancouver in 1979.

In 1982, Toronto Star critic Gina Mallet named Cooper Best Supporting Actress for her appearance in Paul Gross's Dead of Winter, which had its premiere at the Toronto Free Theatre in October 1982.

Cooper went on to initiate such notable roles as Juliet in Ann-Marie MacDonald's Goodnight Desdemona (Good Morning Juliet), a Canadian feminist theatre classic first produced in 1988 by Toronto's Nightwood Theatre, and Fedoysa in the premiere of George F. Walker's  award-winning play Nothing Sacred.

Writing
Cooper is most well-known as a playwright. She graduated from the Creative Writing MFA program at the University of Guelph in 2013.

She has written numerous original pieces and adaptations for CBC Radio Drama. She worked as story editor on the award-winning series, Afghanada, and she also produced the show's second season and directed five of its episodes. Cooper dramatized The Englishman’s Boy (1998), Alias Grace (1998), Away, The Secret World of Og (Silver Medal Award Winner – New York Festival – International Radio Awards, 2006), and adapted Rohinton Mistry’s book, A Fine Balance (2005), which, liker her original play, It Came from Beyond!, garnered her a nomination for a Writers Guild of Canada Award. Another popular original drama is Cooper's series, The Super Adventures of Mary Marvelous.

Cooper's most well-known play is Innocence Lost: A Play about Steven Truscott, which was a shortlisted Governor General's Award nominee for the English-language drama in 2009. It was a sold-out hit at the Blyth Festival in 2008 and 2009, moving on to play Ottawa's National Arts Centre in 2013.

Cooper's play Thin Ice, co-written with Baņuta Rubess, won a Dora Mavor Moore Award and a Chalmers Award. Another notable work is Janet Wilson Meets the Queen, which was nominated for the Prix Rideau Award.

Writing credits for television include episodes of Ready or Not, Sesame Park, and Street Legal.

Currently, Cooper is also directing audio books for Penguin Random House.

Plays
Nancy Drew, The Case of the Missing Mother (co-written with Ann-Marie MacDonald)
Clue in the Fast Lane (co-written with Ann-Marie MacDonald)
Psychic Driving (radio drama)
Nellie Bly: Ten Days in a Madhouse
Out of Body
Thin Ice (co-written with Baņuta Rubess)
The Super Adventures of Mary Marvelous (radio drama)
Sheila Goes to War (radio drama)
The Woman in White
Innocence Lost: A Play about Steven Truscott
The Eyes of Heaven
The Lonely Diner: Al Capone in Euphemia Township
It Came from Beyond!
If Truth Be Told
Janet Wilson Meets the Queen
The Other: A Strange Christmas Tale

References 

20th-century Canadian dramatists and playwrights
20th-century Canadian women writers
20th-century Canadian actresses
21st-century Canadian dramatists and playwrights
21st-century Canadian women writers
21st-century Canadian actresses
Canadian women dramatists and playwrights
Canadian radio writers
Canadian stage actresses
Canadian television writers
Writers from Vancouver
Actresses from Vancouver
Year of birth missing (living people)
Living people
Canadian women television writers